"All I Want Is You" is a song by English boy band 911. It was released through Virgin Records on 23 March 1998 as the second single from their second studio album, Moving On (1998), and peaked at number four on the UK Singles Chart. It was 911's second song to chart in New Zealand, where it reached number 34.

Track listings

UK CD1 and Australian CD single
 "All I Want Is You" (radio edit) – 3:50
 "Let's Go Crazy" (live) – 3:48
 "All I Want Is You" (acoustic version) – 4:02

UK CD2
 "All I Want Is You" (radio edit) – 3:50
 "I Believe I Can Fly" (live) – 4:28
 "All I Want Is You" (Peppermint edit) – 3:23

UK cassette single
 "All I Want Is You" (radio edit) – 3:50
 "Let's Go Crazy" (live) – 3:48
 "All I Want Is You" (Peppermint extended mix) – 6:31

European CD single
 "All I Want Is You" (radio edit) – 3:50
 "Let's Go Crazy" (live) – 3:48

Charts

References

External links
 Official music video on YouTube

1998 singles
1998 songs
911 (English group) songs
Virgin Records singles